Lunik 9 can refer to:

 Luník IX, a borough in the city of Košice, Slovakia, with a mostly Roma population
 Luna 9, a Soviet unmanned space mission, the first to achieve a soft landing on the moon